Umiujaq is a northern village (Inuit community) near the eastern shore of Hudson Bay in Nunavik in northern Quebec, Canada. The village was established in 1986 by Inuit from Kuujjuarapik, 160 km to the south, who decided to relocate away from the area affected by the James Bay Hydro-electric Project.  The population in the Canada 2021 Census was 541.

The park headquarters is located in the village, from which the park is accessible by an unpaved road.

Umiujaq, meaning "which resembles a boat" in the Inuttitut language, is located at the foot of a hill resembling an overturned umiaq, a traditional Inuit walrus-skin boat.

Inaccessible by road, Umiujaq is served by the small Umiujaq Airport.

As other villages in the Kativik region, the police services in Umiujaq are provided by the Kativik Regional Police Force.

History
The Inuit negotiated a clause into the 1975 James Bay and Northern Quebec Agreement that provided for the relocation of the Inuit from Kuujjuarapik to a new settlement unaffected by hydro-electric development. Following a referendum, in 1982 the Inuit opted to create a new community where they could preserve their traditional lifestyle in an area where fish and game were not threatened by hydro-electric development. After extensive studies a location was selected, and construction of the new village was completed in 1986.

Demographics 

Education
The Kativik School Board operates the Kiluutaq School.

References

External links
Website of the village of Umiujaq
Demographic and other information from the Department of Indian and Northern Affairs Canada
Weather Forecast for Umiujaq from Environment Canada

Inuit communities in Quebec
Populated places on Hudson Bay
Road-inaccessible communities of Quebec